Conopobathra carbunculata is a moth of the family Gracillariidae. It is known from South Africa, Namibia and Zimbabwe.

References

Gracillariinae
Moths of Sub-Saharan Africa
Lepidoptera of Namibia
Lepidoptera of Zimbabwe
Lepidoptera of South Africa